Richard S. Watson (July 14, 1902 - July 6, 1987) was bishop of the Episcopal Diocese of Utah, serving from 1951 to 1971. He was consecrated on May 1, 1951.

References 
The Deseret News, July 18, 1987, p. 9.

1902 births
1987 deaths
20th-century American Episcopalians
Episcopal bishops of Utah
20th-century American clergy